Poor. Old. Tired. Horse. (POTH) was a British periodical of visual poetry, running for 25 issues from 1962 to 1967. It was published by Wild Hawthorn Press, which was set up a year earlier in 1961 by Ian Hamilton Finlay. Although most associated with the concrete poetry movement, POTH also contained traditional and avant-garde works. The name originates from a poem by the American poet Robert Creeley.

References

External links
Poor. Old. Tired. Horse. archive at UbuWeb

Poetry magazines published in the United Kingdom
Defunct literary magazines published in the United Kingdom
Magazines established in 1962
Magazines disestablished in 1967